Robert Hagmann (born 2 April 1942) is a Swiss former racing cyclist. He was the Swiss National Road Race champion in 1965. He also rode in the 1968 Tour de France.

References

External links
 

1942 births
Living people
Swiss male cyclists
Sportspeople from the canton of Solothurn
Tour de Suisse stage winners